Osborn "Ty" Anderson (October 15, 1908 – January 31, 1989) was an American ice hockey player who competed in the 1932 Winter Olympics.

In 1932, he was a member of the American ice hockey team, which won the silver medal. He played all six matches and scored one goal.

Life & Times

Early Years
Ty Anderson was born in Norway and immigrated to Swampscott, Massachusetts with his parents at an early age. Anderson was an accomplished athlete as a young man standing out as the quarterback for the high school football team and as shortstop for the baseball team in addition to his accomplishments as a hockey player for Swampscott High School. It was his skills as a hockey player that allowed him to play for the Boston Hockey Club (a precursor to the EAHL's Boston Olympics.) and the United States National team.

Playing career

Anderson first played for the United States at the 1931 World Championships, winning his first international Medal. Team USA would only lose a single game in the tournament, being shut out by Canada 2-0, giving the Americans second place and the Silver Medal. The next year Anderson represented the United States at the Olympic Games, where Team USA would fall short against the Canadians again, giving Anderson his second Silver Medal, and lone Olympic Medal. After the Olympics Anderson would join the Atlantic City Sea Gulls in the Tri-State Hockey league. The TSHL would become the Eastern Amateur Hockey League for the 1933-1934 seasons and though it was a sort of minor league for the NHL, Anderson preferred to stay in the EAHL and remained there for 15 years. Anderson would gain a reputation as one of the most gentlemanly players in the EAHL, averaging only 11 penalty minutes a year. He was so respected in the league that on March 9, 1941, he would receive a gold watch for his EAHL services on what was called "Ty Anderson Day", an event that was held by the New York Rovers while Anderson was a member of the visiting Boston Olympics.

Later life
After his Playing Career Anderson moved back to Swampscott and became the high school's ice hockey head coach. Anderson would coach the team from 1948 to 1972, leading them to three North Shore League championships (1958, 1959 and 1963). In the summers Anderson worked as a local golf pro. On January 31, 1989 at the age of 80, Ty Anderson died of pancreatic cancer in a medical center located in Lynn, Massachusetts.

Career statistics

References

1908 births
1989 deaths
American men's ice hockey defensemen
Boston Olympics players
Ice hockey players from Massachusetts
Ice hockey players at the 1932 Winter Olympics
Medalists at the 1932 Winter Olympics
Norwegian emigrants to the United States
Olympic silver medalists for the United States in ice hockey
People from Swampscott, Massachusetts
Sportspeople from Essex County, Massachusetts